Sampov Lun District is a district (srok) of Battambang Province, in northwestern Cambodia.

Administration
The district is subdivided into six communes (khum).

Communes and villages

References

 
Districts of Battambang province